Tom Ruud (born 1 October 1950) is a Norwegian businessman and banker.

He graduated from the Norwegian Institute of Technology in 1974 with the siv.ing. degree. He was a consultant in International Business Machines before being hired in the bank Den norske Creditbank in 1984. He was an executive in the Aker system before being hired as CEO of the bank Kreditkassen in 1997. The bank then became a part of the multinational company Nordea. From 2001 he was Nordea's country senior executive in Norway, and the corporation's leader of "Banking & Capital Market Products". In 2008 he left Nordea, whose leadership has an upper age limit of 60. He was hired as a director in Umoe.

He is the chair of Umoe Bioenergy and leader of the corporate council and electoral committee in Norske Skog. He was the chair of the Orkla Group from 2001 to 2002.

References

1950 births
Living people
Norwegian Institute of Technology alumni
Norwegian bankers
Orkla ASA people
Nordea people